Maria Natanovna Smith-Falkner (February 16 [February 4, Old Style], 1878 in  Taganrog – March 7, 1968 in Moscow) was a Soviet economist, statistician and a corresponding member of the Academy of Sciences of the USSR from 1939 onwards. She was a member of the Communist Party of the Soviet Union, having joined the Bolsheviks in 1918.

Biography
She was born into the family of a Jewish merchant. In 1901 she went to London to study at the London School of Economics, returning to Russia in 1905. She then got involved with the 1905 revolution. She joined the Menshevik faction of the Russian Social Democratic Labour Party  and was arrested four times. This included an occasion in December 1905, when she organised an illegal conference in Moscow of the trade union of textile workers. She was arrested with the entire delegation of the Saint Petersburg Soviet.
 1918-19 – chief of the department of economic research at VSNH (All-Russian Council of National Economy). Member of the Coil Section of the VSNH.
 1919 – served in the Red Army in the Southern Front in the course of the Russian Civil War.
 Since 1921 – taught at universities and colleges in Moscow (the Moscow State University, the Georgi Plekhanov Moscow Institute of National Economy, the Oil Institute and others).
 1925 – earned her doctorate in economics.
 1921 – 1924 – professor at the faculty of social studies of Moscow State University 
 1924 – 1930 –  professor at Moscow Institute of National Economy.
 1925 – 1934 - full member scholar at the Communist Academy of the Central Executive Committee (Moscow).
 1926 – 1930 – member of Board of the Central Statistical Administration of the USSR.
 1930 – 1934 – professor at the International Lenin School.
 1934 – 1936 – professor at the Economic Research Institute attached to the Gosplan (the State Planning Committee).
 1937 – editor of the State Socio-Economic Publishing House.
 1938 – 1941 – professor at Moscow Economic Planning Institute.
 1941 – 1944 – senior staff scientist at the Economics Institute of the Academy of Sciences of USSR.
 1944 – 1946 – senior staff scientist at the Institute of Foreign Trade.
 1948 – 1955 – team manager at the Economics Institute of the Academy of Sciences of the USSR.

Scientific interests
Smith-Falkner's research was focused on the issues of political economy of capitalism and socialism. Her scientific interests were: economics of capitalism and socialism, statistics theory, the status of the working class in the Western countries, etc. She conducted her research at the Institute of Economic Studies attached to the Gosplan (the State Planning Committee) and the Economic Institute of the Academy of Sciences of the USSR.

Maria Smith-Falkner edited the works by David Ricardo and Sir William Petty to be published in the Soviet Union.

Major works
  (The Food Question in England) St. Petersburg, 1917, The book was marked by Vladimir Lenin in the Book Chroncle (Knizhnaya letopis) journal
  (Class Struggle in Modern England), Moscow, 1922
  (The Moving Sources and Trends of Crises and the Status of Proletariat), Moscow, 1927
  (The Theory and Practice of the Soviet Statistics) (Collected articles), Moscow, 1930
  (The Status of the Working Class in the Capitalist Countries in the Light of Karl Marx's Pauperization Theory) Moscow, 1933
  (The Status of the Working Class in the USA, Great Britain and France after the WWII) Moscow, 1953
  (The Studies on the History of the Bourgeois Political Economy. Mid 19th – Mid 20th century) Moscow, 1961

Awards and prizes
Maria Smith-Falkner was awarded the Order of Lenin, another order and a medal.

References

 Encyclopaedia of Taganrog'', 2nd edition, Taganrog, 2003.

1878 births
1968 deaths
People from Taganrog
People from Yekaterinoslav Governorate
Bolsheviks
Communist Party of the Soviet Union members
Marxian economists
Russian women economists
Soviet economists
Alumni of the University of London
Academic staff of Moscow State University
Corresponding Members of the USSR Academy of Sciences